DYRD (102.3 FM), broadcasting as 102.3 Kiss FM, is a radio station owned and operated by the Bohol Chronicle Radio Corporation. The station's studio and transmitter facilities are located at Bohol Chronicle Bldg., #56 Bernardino Inting St., Tagbilaran. Based on a survey conducted by Holy Name University Center for Research and Publications in 2017, it is ranked as the most listened to FM station.

References

Radio stations established in 2007
Radio stations in Bohol